Luka Cerar (born 26 May 1993) is a Slovenian footballer who plays for NK Radomlje.

References

External links
NZS profile 

1993 births
Living people
Slovenian footballers
Association football midfielders
NK Domžale players
NK Radomlje players
NK Krka players
Slovenian Second League players
Slovenian PrvaLiga players
Slovenia youth international footballers